Kennedy Center Field is a community baseball field at the Kennedy Center YMCA recreation camp on West Virginia Route 2 about  north of Huntington, West Virginia. The field is used by the Marshall University baseball team. The field had almost no provisions for spectators, and limited locker rooms, in 2014, the university funded an upgrade with some spectator facilities and an artificial turf infield, but the field remains unlighted. The upgrades were accompanied with a five-year lease from the school. Because of its inadequacies, Marshall played all conference home games at Appalachian Power Park in Charleston,  from campus. For the 2019 season, the university funded further upgrades which allowed all its games to be played at the venue. 

Because the facility lies outside the city's floodwall and is on the banks of the Ohio River, games are often cancelled or moved to an assortment of alternative fields.

The facility is named for Daniel Kennedy of Huntington, WV. 

In 2018, the school purchased land near campus for a new baseball venue. Its projected completion date is March 2024.

See also
 List of NCAA Division I baseball venues

Baseball venues in West Virginia
Marshall Thundering Herd baseball